Adriene K. Veninger (born 1958) is a Canadian artist. Veninger was born in Bratislava, Czechoslovakia. Veninger is known particularly for her photographic works.

Her work is included in the collections of the National Gallery of Canada and the Museum of Fine Arts Houston.

References

21st-century Canadian women artists
20th-century Canadian women artists
1958 births
Living people
21st-century Canadian photographers
20th-century Canadian photographers
Canadian women photographers
Artists from Bratislava
Czechoslovak emigrants to Canada
20th-century women photographers
21st-century women photographers